Bernard Edward Masterson (August 10, 1911 – May 16, 1963) was an American football player and coach.  He served as the head football coach at the University of Nebraska–Lincoln from 1946 to 1947, compiling a record of 5–13. Masterson played college football at Nebraska from 1931 to 1933. He played professionally in the National Football League (NFL) with the Chicago Bears from 1934 to 1940.

Playing career
Masterson was a three-sport athlete at Lincoln High. He was an all-state back in football, a starter on the 1930 state championship basketball team, and a track star.
 Moving on to the University of Nebraska–Lincoln, he starred from 1931 to 1933 as a back on three straight unbeaten Big Six championship teams.  He was selected All-Big Six in 1933.

Masterson played quarterback for the Chicago Bears from 1934 to 1940 when the Bears were known as the "Monsters of the Midway". During his pro career, the Bears were 59–19–3 and were in three NFL championship playoffs.  Bernie has an NFL career total of 3,372 passing yards and 35 touchdowns.

Coaching career
In 1940, Clark Shaughnessy hired Masterson to coach Stanford quarterback Frankie Albert.

He joined the United States Navy in 1942, and coached Navy teams for Iowa and St. Mary's Pre-Flight until 1945.

He came back to Nebraska as head football coach for 1946 and 1947. He went 5–13 in the two seasons as head coach.

Death and honors

Masterson died of a heart attack in Chicago on May 16, 1963, and was buried at All Saints Cemetery in Des Plaines. He was inducted into the Nebraska Football Hall of Fame in 1977.

Head coaching record

References

External links
 

1911 births
1963 deaths
American football quarterbacks
Chicago Bears players
Iowa Hawkeyes football coaches
Lewis Flyers football coaches
Nebraska Cornhuskers football coaches
Nebraska Cornhuskers football players
Saint Mary's Pre-Flight Air Devils football coaches
Stanford Cardinal football coaches
UCLA Bruins football coaches
United States Navy personnel of World War II
United States Navy officers
People from Shenandoah, Iowa
Sportspeople from Lincoln, Nebraska
Coaches of American football from Nebraska
Players of American football from Nebraska
Educators from Nebraska
Military personnel from Nebraska